Big Peak, at  above sea level a peak in the Smoky Mountains of Idaho.

References 

Mountains of Idaho
Mountains of Camas County, Idaho
Sawtooth National Forest